Walid Mohamed Hussain (born 18 March 1961) is an Egyptian former judoka. He competed at the 1984 Summer Olympics and the 1988 Summer Olympics.

References

External links
 

1961 births
Living people
Egyptian male judoka
Olympic judoka of Egypt
Judoka at the 1984 Summer Olympics
Judoka at the 1988 Summer Olympics
Place of birth missing (living people)
20th-century Egyptian people
21st-century Egyptian people